Reb Yaakov: The Life and Times of HaGaon Rabbi Yaakov Kamenetsky is a biography on Rabbi Yaakov Kamenetsky, written by Yonasan Rosenblum and based on the research of Rabbi Noson Kamenetsky. It was published by Artscroll-Mesorah in 1993 as part of the Artscroll History Series.

Overview 

The book is divided into two sections. Part I details the life of Rabbi Kamenetsky, beginning with his childhood and school years, moving on to his rabbinic career in Lithuania and the United States. It also discusses the Slabodka Yeshiva of Lithuania in depth. Part II focuses on specific attributes of Rabbi Kamenetsky, with a chapter dedicated to his character, another to his general happiness, a third to his guidance, and several more.

The book was published with the help of Rabbi Kamenetsky's family, namely his sons, Rabbis Shmuel, Binyamin and Avraham Kamenetsky; his sons-in-law, Rabbis Hirsh Diskind and Yisroel Shurin; and his grandsons, Rabbis Mordechai and Dovid Kamenetzkty and Rabbi Yitzchak Shurin. The cover picture was supplied by Ed Bernstein, while other photos and illustrative materials came from the Chicago Community Kollel, Dos Yiddishe Vort, Jewish Library Montreal, The Jewish Observer, New York Public Library, Torah Umesorah, Trainer Studios, Yeshivas Slabodka, and many individuals.

Reception 
Rabbi Aharon Feldman in The Jewish Observer called Reb Yaakov a "remarkable book which genuinely evokes the spirit of Reb Yaakov." He contrasted the book with other biographies about gedolim which are written in a hagiographic fashion, and don't focus on the subject's hard work. "With notable exceptions, [gedolim biographies] frequently ignore the self-sacrifice and dedication which of necessity must have gone into the development of every gadol," Rabbi Feldman writes. "The second flaw of the gedolim genre is the usual emphasis on the extraordinary intellectual gifts of these gedolim–their lightning grasp, brilliance of conception and total recall; i.e., their genius aspect....It would serve the reader better to emphasize the hard work, sweat and tears that went into making them gedolim. Portraying gedolim as geniuses tends to make their accomplishments appear unattainable....Reb Yaakov: the Life and Times of Hagaon Rabbi Yaakov Kamenetsky, by Yonason Rosenblum, based on the research of Reb Yaakov's illustrious son, Rabbi Noson Kamenetzky, is a refreshing exception to the standard gedolim biography genre."

The book was used for reference in Rabbi A. Leib Scheinbaum's A World That Was: America (published by Hebrew Academy of Cleveland), and recommended for further reading. Additionally, Devorah Gliksman writes in her book, A Tale of Two Worlds: Rabbi Dovid and Rebbetzin Basya Bender that she used Reb Yaakov as a historical reference.

References 

Jewish American literature
American biographies
Biographies about religious figures
20th-century history books
Books about Lithuania
History books about Jews and Judaism